The 2014 Nottingham Challenge (known for sponsorship reasons as the Aegon Nottingham Challenge) was a professional tennis tournament played on outdoor grass courts. It was the fourth edition of the tournament and part of the 2014 ATP Challenger Tour and the 2014 ITF Women's Circuit, offering a total of €64,000 for the men and $50,000 for the women in prize money. It took place in Nottingham, United Kingdom, on 9–15 June 2014.

ATP entrants

Singles

Seeds 

 1 Rankings as of 26 May 2014

Other entrants 
The following players received wildcards into the singles main draw:
  Edward Corrie
  Kyle Edmund
  Oliver Golding
  Marcus Willis

The following players received entry as special exempt into the singles main draw:
  Dimitar Kutrovsky

The following players use protected ranking to gain entry into the singles main draw:
  Sergei Bubka

The following players received entry from the qualifying draw:
  Nick Kyrgios
  Martin Fischer
  John-Patrick Smith
  Michael Venus

Doubles

Seeds 

 1 Rankings as of 26 May 2014

Other entrants 
The following pairs received wildcards into the doubles main draw:
  Lewis Burton /  Marcus Willis
  David Rice /  Sean Thornley
  Edward Corrie /  Daniel Smethurst

WTA entrants

Singles

Seeds 

 1 Rankings as of 26 May 2014

Other entrants 
The following players received wildcards into the singles main draw:
  Katie Boulter
  Samantha Murray
  Isabelle Wallace
  Jade Windley

The following players received entry from the qualifying draw:
  Jarmila Gajdošová
  Miharu Imanishi
  Ons Jabeur
  Anett Kontaveit

The following player received entry with a lucky loser:
  Kateryna Kozlova

Doubles

Seeds 

 1 Rankings as of 26 May 2014

Other entrants 
The following pair received wildcards into the doubles main draw:
  Katie Boulter /  Mayo Hibi

Champions

Men's singles 

  Nick Kyrgios def.  Samuel Groth, 7–6(7–3), 7–6(9–7)

Women's singles 

  Jarmila Gajdošová def.  Timea Bacsinszky, 6–2, 6–2

Men's doubles 

  Rameez Junaid /  Michael Venus def.  Ruben Bemelmans /  Go Soeda, 4–6, 7–6(7–1), [10–6]

Women's doubles 

  Jarmila Gajdošová /  Arina Rodionova def.  Verónica Cepede Royg /  Stephanie Vogt, 7–6(7–0), 6–1

External links 
 2014 Nottingham Challenge at ITFtennis.com
 Official website

2014 ITF Women's Circuit
2014 ATP Challenger Tour
2014
2014 in English tennis
2010s in Nottingham